Maoism, officially called Mao Zedong Thought by the Chinese Communist Party, is a variety of Marxism–Leninism that Mao Zedong developed to realise a socialist revolution in the agricultural, pre-industrial society of the Republic of China and later the People's Republic of China. The philosophical difference between Maoism and traditional Marxism–Leninism is that the peasantry is the revolutionary vanguard in pre-industrial societies rather than the proletariat. This updating and adaptation of Marxism–Leninism to Chinese conditions in which revolutionary praxis is primary and ideological orthodoxy is secondary represents urban Marxism–Leninism adapted to pre-industrial China. Later theoreticians expanded on the idea that Mao had adapted Marxism–Leninism to Chinese conditions, arguing that he had in fact updated it fundamentally, and that Maoism could be applied universally throughout the world. This ideology is often referred to as Marxism–Leninism–Maoism to distinguish it from the original ideas of Mao.

From the 1950s until the Chinese economic reforms of Deng Xiaoping in the late 1970s, Maoism was the political and military ideology of the Chinese Communist Party and Maoist revolutionary movements worldwide. After the Sino-Soviet split of the 1960s, the Chinese Communist Party and the Communist Party of the Soviet Union each claimed to be the sole heir and successor to Joseph Stalin concerning the correct interpretation of Marxism–Leninism and the ideological leader of communism.

The term "Maoism" is a creation of Mao's supporters; Mao himself always rejected it.

History

Chinese intellectual tradition 
At the turn of the 20th century, the contemporary Chinese intellectual tradition was defined by two central concepts: (i) iconoclasm and (ii) nationalism.

Iconoclastic revolution and anti-Confucianism 
By the turn of the 20th century, a proportionately small yet socially significant cross-section of China's traditional elite (i.e., landlords and bureaucrats) found themselves increasingly sceptical of the efficacy and even the moral validity of Confucianism. These sceptical iconoclasts formed a new segment of Chinese society, a modern intelligentsia whose arrival—or as the historian of China Maurice Meisner would label it, their defection—heralded the beginning of the destruction of the gentry as a social class in China.

The fall of the last imperial Chinese dynasty in 1911 marked the final failure of the Confucian moral order, and it did much to make Confucianism synonymous with political and social conservatism in the minds of Chinese intellectuals. This association of conservatism and Confucianism lent to the iconoclastic nature of Chinese intellectual thought during the first decades of the 20th century.

Chinese iconoclasm was expressed most clearly and vociferously by Chen Duxiu during the New Culture Movement, which occurred between 1915 and 1919. Proposing the "total destruction of the traditions and values of the past", the New Culture Movement was spearheaded by the New Youth, a periodical published by Chen Duxiu and profoundly influenced the young Mao Zedong, whose first published work appeared in the magazine's pages.

Nationalism and the appeal of Marxism 
Along with iconoclasm, radical anti-imperialism dominated the Chinese intellectual tradition and slowly evolved into a fierce nationalist fervor which influenced Mao's philosophy immensely and was crucial in adapting Marxism to the Chinese model. Vital to understanding Chinese nationalist sentiments of the time is the Treaty of Versailles, which was signed in 1919. The Treaty aroused a wave of bitter nationalist resentment in Chinese intellectuals as lands formerly ceded to Germany in Shandong were—without consultation with the Chinese—transferred to Japanese control rather than returned to Chinese sovereignty.

The adverse reaction culminated in the 4 May Incident in 1919, during which a protest began with 3,000 students in Beijing displaying their anger at the announcement of the Versailles Treaty's concessions to Japan. The protest turned violent as protesters began attacking the homes and offices of ministers who were seen as cooperating with or being in the direct pay of the Japanese. The 4 May Incident and Movement which followed "catalyzed the political awakening of a society which had long seemed inert and dormant".

Another international event would have a significant impact not only on Mao but also on the Chinese intelligentsia. The Russian Revolution elicited great interest among Chinese intellectuals, although the socialist revolution in China was not considered a viable option until after the 4 May Incident. Afterward, "[t]o become a Marxist was one way for a Chinese intellectual to reject both the traditions of the Chinese past and Western domination of the Chinese present".

Yan'an period between November 1935 and March 1947 
Immediately following the Long March, Mao and the Chinese Communist Party (CCP) were headquartered in Yan'an, a prefecture-level city in Shaanxi province. During this period, Mao established himself as a Marxist theoretician and produced most of the works that would later be canonised as the "thought of Mao Zedong". The rudimentary philosophical base of Chinese Communist ideology is laid down in Mao's numerous dialectical treatises and was conveyed to newly recruited party members. This period established ideological independence from Moscow for Mao and the CCP.

Although the Yan'an period did answer some of the ideological and theoretical questions raised by the Chinese Communist Revolution, it left many crucial questions unresolved, including how the Chinese Communist Party was supposed to launch a socialist revolution while wholly separated from the urban sphere.

Mao Zedong's intellectual development 

Mao's intellectual development can be divided into five significant periods, namely:

 the initial Marxist period from 1920 to 1926
 the formative Maoist period from 1927 to 1935
 the mature Maoist period from 1935 to 1940
 the Civil-War period from 1940 to 1949
 the post-1949 period following the revolutionary victory

Initial Marxist period (1920–1926) 
Marxist thinking employs imminent socioeconomic explanations, whereas Mao's reasons were declarations of his enthusiasm. Mao did not believe education alone would transition from capitalism to communism for three main reasons. (1) Psychologically, the capitalists would not repent and turn towards communism on their own; (2) the rulers must be overthrown by the people; (3) "the proletarians are discontented, and a demand for communism has arisen and had already become a fact". These reasons do not provide socioeconomic explanations, which usually form the core of Marxist ideology.

Formative Maoist period (1927–1935) 
In this period, Mao avoided all theoretical implications in his literature and employed a minimum of Marxist category thought. His writings in this period failed to elaborate on what he meant by the "Marxist method of political and class analysis". Before this period, Mao was concerned with the dichotomy between knowledge and action. He was more concerned with the dichotomy between revolutionary ideology and counter-revolutionary objective conditions. There was more correlation drawn between China and the Soviet model.

Mature Maoist period (1935–1940) 
Intellectually, this was Mao's most fruitful time. The orientation shift was apparent in his pamphlet Strategic Problems of China's Revolutionary War (December 1936). This pamphlet tried to provide a theoretical veneer for his concern with revolutionary practice. Mao started to separate from the Soviet model since it was not automatically applicable to China. China's unique set of historical circumstances demanded a correspondingly unique application of Marxist theory, an application that would have to diverge from the Soviet approach.

Civil War period (1940–1949) 
Unlike the Mature period, this period was intellectually barren. Mao focused more on revolutionary practice and paid less attention to Marxist theory. He continued to emphasise theory as practice-oriented knowledge. The most crucial topic of theory he delved into was in connection with the Cheng Feng movement of 1942. Here, Mao summarised the correlation between Marxist theory and Chinese practice: "The target is the Chinese revolution, the arrow is Marxism–Leninism. We Chinese communists seek this arrow for no other purpose than to hit the target of the Chinese revolution and the revolution of the east". The only new emphasis was Mao's concern with two types of subjectivist deviation: (1) dogmatism, the excessive reliance upon abstract theory; (2) empiricism, excessive dependence on experience.

Post-Civil War period (1949–1976) 
To Mao, the victory of 1949 was a confirmation of theory and practice. "Optimism is the keynote to Mao's intellectual orientation in the post-1949 period". Mao assertively revised the theory to relate it to the new practice of socialist construction. These revisions are apparent in the 1951 version of On Contradiction. "In the 1930s, when Mao talked about contradiction, he meant the contradiction between subjective thought and objective reality. In Dialectal Materialism of 1940, he saw idealism and materialism as two possible correlations between subjective thought and objective reality. In the 1940s, he introduced no new elements into his understanding of the subject-object contradiction. In the 1951 version of On Contradiction, he saw contradiction as a universal principle underlying all processes of development, yet with each contradiction possessed of its own particularity".

Differences from Marxism 

Maoism and Marxism differ in how the proletariat is defined and in which political and economic conditions would start a communist revolution.
 For Karl Marx, the proletariat was the urban working class, which was determined in the revolution by which the bourgeoisie overthrew feudalism. For Mao Zedong, the revolutionary class was the millions of peasants he referred to as the popular masses. Mao based his revolution upon the peasantry. They possessed, according to him, two qualities: (i) they were poor and (ii) they were a political blank slate; in Mao's words, "[a] clean sheet of paper has no blotches, and so the newest and most beautiful words can be written on it".
 For Marx, the proletarian revolution was internally fuelled by the capitalist mode of production; as capitalism developed, "a tension arises between the productive forces and the mode of production". The political tension between the productive forces (the workers) and the owners of the means of production (the capitalists) would be an inevitable incentive for the proletarian revolution, resulting in a communist society. Mao did not subscribe to Marx's theory of inevitable cyclicality in the economic system. His goal was to unify the Chinese nation and so realise progressive change for China in the form of communism; hence, a revolution was needed at once. In The Great Union of the Popular Masses (1919), Mao wrote that "[t]he decadence of the state, the sufferings of humanity, and the darkness of society have all reached an extreme".

After Mao Zedong's death

China 

Shortly after Mao died in 1976, Deng Xiaoping initiated socialist market reforms in 1978, thereby beginning the radical change in Mao's ideology in the People's Republic of China (PRC). Although Mao Zedong Thought nominally remains the state ideology, Deng's admonition to "seek truth from facts" means that state policies are judged on their practical consequences, and in many areas, the role of ideology in determining policy has thus been considerably reduced. Deng also separated Mao from Maoism, making it clear that Mao was fallible, and hence the truth of Maoism comes from observing social consequences rather than by using Mao's quotations as holy writ, as was done in Mao's lifetime.

Contemporary Maoists in China criticise the social inequalities created by the revisionist Communist Party. Some Maoists say that Deng's Reform and Opening economic policies that introduced market principles spelled the end of Maoism in China. However, Deng asserted that his reforms were upholding Mao Zedong Thought in accelerating the output of the country's productive forces. A recent example of a Chinese politician regarded as neo-Maoist in terms of political strategies and mass mobilisation via red songs was Bo Xilai in Chongqing.

In addition, the party constitution has been rewritten to give the socialist ideas of Deng prominence over those of Mao. One consequence of this is that groups outside China that describe themselves as Maoist generally regard China as having repudiated Maoism and restoring capitalism, and there is a broad perception both inside and outside China that China has abandoned Maoism. However, while it is now permissible to question the particular actions of Mao and talk about excesses taken in the name of Maoism, there is a prohibition in China on either publicly questioning the validity of Maoism or whether the current actions of the CCP are "Maoist".

Although Mao Zedong Thought is still listed as one of the Four Cardinal Principles of the People's Republic of China, its historical role has been re-assessed. The Communist Party now says that Maoism was necessary to break China free from its feudal past, but it also says that the actions of Mao are seen to have led to excesses during the Cultural Revolution.

The official view is that China has now reached an economic and political stage, known as the primary stage of socialism, in which China faces new and different problems completely unforeseen by Mao, and as such, the solutions that Mao advocated are no longer relevant to China's current conditions. The official proclamation of the new CCP stance came in June 1981, when the Sixth Plenum of the Eleventh National Party Congress Central Committee took place. The 35,000-word Resolution on Certain Questions in the History of Our Party Since the Founding of the People's Republic of China reads:
Chief responsibility for the grave 'Left' error of the 'cultural revolution,' an error comprehensive in magnitude and protracted in duration, does indeed lie with Comrade Mao Zedong [...] [and] far from making a correct analysis of many problems, he confused right and wrong and the people with the enemy [...] herein lies his tragedy.

Scholars outside China see this re-working of the definition of Maoism as providing an ideological justification for what they see as the restoration of the essentials of capitalism in China by Deng and his successors, who sought to "eradicate all ideological and physiological obstacles to economic reform". In 1978, this led to the Sino-Albanian split when Albanian leader Enver Hoxha denounced Deng as a revisionist and formed Hoxhaism as an anti-revisionist form of Marxism.

Mao Zedong Thought is defined in the CCP's Constitution as "Marxism–Leninism applied in a Chinese context", synthesised by Mao and China's "first-generation leaders". It asserts that class struggle continues even if the proletariat has already overthrown the bourgeoisie and there are capitalist restorationist elements within the Communist Party itself. Maoism provided the CCP's first comprehensive theoretical guideline regarding how to continue the socialist revolution, the creation of a socialist society, and socialist military construction and highlights various contradictions in society to be addressed by what is termed "socialist construction". While it continues to be lauded to be the major force that defeated "imperialism and feudalism" and created a "New China" by the Chinese Communist Party, the ideology survives only in name on the Communist Party's Constitution as Deng Xiaoping abolished most Maoist practices in 1978, advancing a guiding ideology called "socialism with Chinese characteristics".

The CCP officially regards Mao himself as a "great revolutionary leader" for his role in fighting against the Japanese fascist invasion during the Second World War and creating the People's Republic of China, but Maoism, as implemented between 1959 and 1976, is regarded by today's CCP as an economic and political disaster. In Deng's day, support of radical Maoism was regarded as a form of "left deviationism" and based on a cult of personality, although these "errors" are officially attributed to the Gang of Four rather than Mao himself. Thousands of Maoists were arrested in the Hua Guofeng period after 1976. The prominent Maoists Zhang Chunqiao and Jiang Qing were sentenced to death with a two-year-reprieve, while others were sentenced to life imprisonment or imprisonment for 15 years.

After the Tiananmen Square protests and massacre, Mao's influence was even weaker than Jin Yong's wuxia novels. However, in the 2020s, influenced by the growing wealth gap and the 996 working hour system, Mao's thoughts are being revived in China's generation Z, as they even question authority of the CCP. Chinese government has censored some Maoist posts.

Internationally 

After the death of Mao in 1976 and the resulting power struggles in China that followed, the international Maoist movement was divided into three camps. One group, composed of various ideologically nonaligned groups, gave weak support to the new Chinese leadership under Deng Xiaoping. Another camp denounced the new leadership as traitors to the cause of Marxism–Leninism–Mao Zedong Thought. The third camp sided with the Albanians in denouncing the Three Worlds Theory of the CCP (see the Sino-Albanian split).

The pro-Albanian camp would start to function as an international group as well (led by Enver Hoxha and the APL) and was also able to amalgamate many of the communist groups in Latin America, including the Communist Party of Brazil. Later, Latin American Communists, such as Peru's Shining Path, also embraced the tenets of Maoism.

The new Chinese leadership showed little interest in the foreign groups supporting Mao's China. Many of the foreign parties that were fraternal parties aligned with the Chinese government before 1975 either disbanded, abandoned the new Chinese government entirely, or even renounced Marxism–Leninism and developed into non-communist, social democratic parties. What is today called the international Maoist movement evolved out of the second camp—the parties that opposed Deng and said they upheld the true legacy of Mao.

Components

New Democracy 

The theory of the New Democracy was known to the Chinese revolutionaries from the late 1940s. This thesis held that for most people, the long road to socialism could only be opened by a "national, popular, democratic, anti-feudal and anti-imperialist revolution, run by the communists".

People's war 

Holding that "political power grows out of the barrel of a gun", Maoism emphasises the "revolutionary struggle of the vast majority of people against the exploiting classes and their state structures", which Mao termed a "people's war". Mobilizing large parts of rural populations to revolt against established institutions by engaging in guerrilla warfare, Maoist Thought focuses on "surrounding the cities from the countryside".

Maoism views the industrial-rural divide as a major division exploited by capitalism, identifying capitalism as involving industrial urban developed First World societies ruling over rural developing Third World societies. Maoism identifies peasant insurgencies in particular national contexts as part of a context of world revolution, in which Maoism views the global countryside as overwhelming the global cities. Due to this imperialism by the capitalist urban First World toward the rural Third World, Maoism has endorsed national liberation movements in the Third World.

Mass line 

Building on the theory of the vanguard party by Vladimir Lenin, the theory of the mass line outlines a strategy for the revolutionary leadership of the masses, consolidation of the dictatorship of the proletariat, and strengthening of the party and the building of socialism. The mass line can be summarised as "from the masses, to the masses". It has three components or stages:
 Gathering the diverse ideas of the masses.
 Processing or concentrating these ideas from the perspective of revolutionary Marxism, in light of the long-term, ultimate interests of the masses (which the masses may sometimes only dimly perceive) and in light of a scientific analysis of the objective situation.
 Returning these concentrated ideas to the masses in the form of a political line which will advance the mass struggle toward revolution.

These three steps should be applied repeatedly, reiteratively uplifting practice and knowledge to higher and higher stages.

Cultural Revolution 
The theory of cultural revolution - rooted in Marxism-Leninism thought - states that the proletarian revolution and the dictatorship of the proletariat do not wipe out bourgeois ideology; the class struggle continues and even intensifies during socialism. Therefore, a constant struggle against bourgeois ideology, traditional cultural values, and the social roots that encourage both of them must be conducted in order to create and maintain a society in which socialism can succeed.

Practical examples of this theory's application can be seen in the rapid social changes underwent by post-revolution Soviet Union in the late 1920s -1930s as well as pre-revolution China in the New Culture and May Fourth movements of the 1910s-1920s. Both of these sociocultural movements can be seen as shaping Maoist theory on the need for and goals of Cultural Revolution, and subsequently the mass cultural movements enacted by the CCP under Mao, which include the Great Leap Forward, the Anti-rightist movement of the 1950s, and the Great Proletarian Cultural Revolution of the 1960s-1970s.

The social upheavals that occurred from the New Culture Movement - as well as the May Fourth Movement that followed it - largely focused around the dismantling of traditional Han Chinese cultural norms in which the majority of the populace were illiterate and largely uneducated.  This consequence of this social dynamic was that political and economic power largely resided in the hands of a small group of educated elites, and Han Chinese culture formed around principles of respect and reverence for these educated and powerful authority figures. The aforementioned movements sought to combat these social norms through grassroots educational campaigns which were focused primarily around giving educational opportunities towards to people from traditionally uneducated families and normalising all people to be comfortable making challenges towards traditional figures of authority in Confucian society.

The cultural revolution experienced by the Soviet Union was similar to the New Culture and May Fourth movements experienced by China in that it also placed a great importance on mass education and the normalisation of challenging of traditional cultural norms in the realising of a socialist society. However, the movements occurring in the Soviet Union had a far more adversarial mindset towards proponents of traditional values, with leadership in the party taking action to censor and exile these "enemies of change" on over 200 occasions, rather than exclusively putting pressure on these forces by enacting additive social changes such as education campaigns. 

The most prominent example of a Maoist application of cultural revolution can be seen in the Great Proletarian Cultural Revolution of the 1960s and 1970s wherein Mao claimed that "Revisionist" forces had entered society and infiltrated the government, with the goal of reinstating traditionalism and capitalism in China. Leaning more on the example of the Soviet Union, which involved the silencing and subjugation of adversarial political forces to help bring about a cultural change, Mao called for his followers to speak openly and critically about revisionist forces that they were observing in society and to expel them, assuring them that their actions would be endorsed by the party and that their efforts would in no way be interfered with. This warrant granted to the public ultimately lead to roughly ten years in which those seen as "Revisionist" forces - largely understood to mean landlords, rich peasants, and the so called "bourgeoise academic" - were publicly criticised and denounced in places of gathering, and in more extreme examples had physical violence inflicted on them, including being beaten, tortured, and/or killed for their perceived crimes.

Contradiction 
Mao drew from the writings of Karl Marx, Friedrich Engels, and Vladimir Lenin in elaborating his theory. Philosophically, his most important reflections emerge on the concept of "contradiction" (maodun). In two major essays, On Contradiction and On the Correct Handling of Contradictions Among the People, he adopts the positivist-empiricist idea (shared by Engels) that contradiction is present in matter itself and thus also in the ideas of the brain. Matter always develops through a dialectical contradiction: "The interdependence of the contradictory aspects present in all things and the struggle between these aspects determine the life of things and push their development forward. There is nothing that does not contain contradiction; without contradiction nothing would exist".

Mao held that contradictions were the essential feature of society, and a wide range of contradictions dominates society, this calls for various strategies. Revolution is necessary to resolve antagonistic contradictions between labour and capital fully. Contradictions within the revolutionary movement call for an ideological correction to prevent them from becoming antagonistic. Furthermore, each contradiction (including class struggle, the contradiction holding between relations of production and the concrete development of forces of production) expresses itself in a series of other contradictions, some dominant, others not. "There are many contradictions in the process of development of a complex thing, and one of them is necessarily the principal contradiction whose existence and development determine or influence the existence and development of the other contradictions".

The principal contradiction should be tackled with priority when trying to make the fundamental contradiction "solidify". Mao elaborates on this theme in the essay On Practice, "on the relation between knowledge and practice, between knowing and doing". Here, Practice connects "contradiction" with "class struggle" in the following way, claiming that inside a mode of production, there are three realms where practice functions: economic production, scientific experimentation (which also takes place in economic production and should not be radically disconnected from the former) and finally class struggle. These are the proper objects of economy, scientific knowledge, and politics.

These three spheres deal with matter in its various forms, socially mediated. As a result, they are the only realms where knowledge may arise (since truth and knowledge only make sense in relation to matter, according to Marxist epistemology). Mao emphasises—like Marx in trying to confront the "bourgeois idealism" of his time—that knowledge must be based on empirical evidence. Knowledge results from hypotheses verified in the contrast with a real object; this real object, despite being mediated by the subject's theoretical frame, retains its materiality and will offer resistance to those ideas that do not conform to its truth. Thus in each of these realms (economic, scientific, and political practice), contradictions (principle and secondary) must be identified, explored, and put to function to achieve the communist goal. This involves the need to know "scientifically" how the masses produce (how they live, think and work), to obtain knowledge of how class struggle (the central contradiction that articulates a mode of production in its various realms) expresses itself.

Three Worlds Theory 
Three Worlds Theory states that during the Cold War, two imperialist states formed the "first world"—the United States and the Soviet Union. The second world consisted of the other imperialist states in their spheres of influence. The third world consisted of non-imperialist countries. Both the first and the second world exploit the third world, but the first world is the most aggressive party. The first- and second-world workers are "bought up" by imperialism, preventing socialist revolution. On the other hand, the people of the third world have not even a short-sighted interest in the prevailing circumstances. Hence revolution is most likely to appear in third-world countries, which again will weaken imperialism, opening up for revolutions in other countries too.

Agrarian socialism 
Maoism departs from conventional European-inspired Marxism in that it focuses on the agrarian countryside rather than the urban industrial forces—this is known as agrarian socialism. Notably, Maoist parties in Peru, Nepal, and the Philippines have adopted equal stresses on urban and rural areas, depending on the country's focus on economic activity. Maoism broke with the framework of the Soviet Union under Nikita Khrushchev, dismissing it as "state capitalist" and "revisionist", a pejorative term among communists referring to those who fight for capitalism in the name of socialism and who depart from historical and dialectical materialism.

Although Maoism is critical of urban industrial capitalist powers, it views urban industrialisation as a prerequisite to expanding economic development and the socialist reorganisation of the countryside, with the goal being the achievement of rural industrialisation that would abolish the distinction between town and countryside.

International influence 

From 1962 onwards, the challenge to the Soviet hegemony in the world communist movement made by the CCP resulted in various divisions in communist parties around the world. At an early stage, the Albanian Party of Labour sided with the CCP. So did many of the mainstream (non-splinter group) Communist parties in South-East Asia, like the Communist Party of Burma, the Communist Party of Thailand, and the Communist Party of Indonesia. Some Asian parties, like the Communist Party of Vietnam and the Workers' Party of Korea, attempted to take a middle-ground position.

Cambodia's Khmer Rouge is said to have been a replica of the Maoist regime. According to the BBC, the Communist Party of Kampuchea (CPK) in Cambodia, better known as the Khmer Rouge, identified strongly with Maoism and is generally labelled a Maoist movement today. However, Maoists and Marxists generally contend that the CPK strongly deviated from Marxist doctrine and the few references to Maoist China in CPK propaganda were critical of the Chinese.

Various efforts have sought to regroup the international communist movement under Maoism since Mao's death in 1976. Many parties and organisations were formed in the West and Third World that upheld links to the CCP. Often they took names such as Communist Party (Marxist–Leninist) or Revolutionary Communist Party to distinguish themselves from the traditional pro-Soviet communist parties. The pro-CCP movements were, in many cases, based on the wave of student radicalism that engulfed the world in the 1960s and 1970s.

Only one Western classic communist party sided with the CCP, the Communist Party of New Zealand. Under the leadership of the CCP and Mao Zedong, a parallel international communist movement emerged to rival that of the Soviets, although it was never as formalised and homogeneous as the pro-Soviet tendency.

Another effort at regrouping the international communist movement is the International Conference of Marxist–Leninist Parties and Organisations (ICMLPO). Three notable parties participating in the ICMLPO are the Marxist–Leninist Party of Germany (MLPD), the Communist Party of the Philippines (CPP), and Marxist–Leninist Communist Organization – Proletarian Way. The ICMLPO seeks to unify around Marxism–Leninism, not Maoism. However, some parties and organisations within the ICMLPO identify as Mao Zedong Thought or Maoist.

Afghanistan 
The Progressive Youth Organization was a Maoist organisation in Afghanistan. It was founded in 1965 with Akram Yari as its first leader, advocating the overthrow of the then-current order through people's war.

The Communist (Maoist) Party of Afghanistan was founded in 2004 through the merger of five MLM parties.

Australia 
The Communist Party of Australia (Marxist-Leninist) is a Maoist organisation in Australia. It was founded in 1964 as a pro-Mao split from the Australian Communist Party.

Bangladesh 
The Purba Banglar Sarbahara Party is a Maoist party in Bangladesh. It was founded in 1968 with Siraj Sikder as its first leader. The party played a role in the Bangladesh Liberation War.

Belgium 
The Sino-Soviet split had a significant influence on communism in Belgium. The pro-Soviet Communist Party of Belgium experienced a split of a Maoist wing under Jacques Grippa. The latter was a lower-ranking CPB member before the split, but Grippa rose in prominence as he formed a worthy internal Maoist opponent to the CPB leadership. His followers were sometimes referred to as Grippisten or Grippistes. When it became clear that the differences between the pro-Moscow leadership and the pro-Beijing wing were too significant, Grippa and his entourage decided to split from the CPB and formed the Communist Party of Belgium – Marxist–Leninist (PCBML). The PCBML had some influence, mainly in the heavily industrialised Borinage region of Wallonia, but never managed to gather more support than the CPB. The latter held most of its leadership and base within the pro-Soviet camp. However, the PCBML was the first European Maoist party and was recognised at its foundation as the largest and most important Maoist organisation in Europe outside of Albania.

Although the PCBML never really gained a foothold in Flanders, there was a reasonably successful Maoist movement in this region. Out of the student unions that formed in the wake of the May 1968 protests, Alle Macht Aan De Arbeiders (AMADA), or All Power To The Workers, was formed as a vanguard party under construction. This Maoist group originated primarily from students from the universities of Leuven and Ghent but did manage to gain some influence among the striking miners during the shutdowns of the Belgian stone coal mines in the late 1960s and early 1970s. This group became the Workers' Party of Belgium (PVDA-PTB) in 1979 and still exists today, although its power base has shifted somewhat from Flanders towards Wallonia. The WPB stayed loyal to the teachings of Mao for a long time, but after a general congress held in 2008, the party formally broke with its Maoist/Stalinist past.

Ecuador 
The Communist Party of Ecuador – Red Sun, also known as Puka Inti, is a small Maoist guerrilla organisation in Ecuador.

India 
The Communist Party of India (Maoist) is the leading Maoist organisation in India. The CPI (Maoist) is designated as a terrorist organzation in India under the Unlawful Activities (Prevention) Act.

Iran 

The Union of Iranian Communists (Sarbedaran) was an Iran Maoist organisation. The UIC (S) was formed in 1976 after the alliance of Maoist groups carrying out military actions within Iran. In 1982, the UIC (S) mobilised forces in forests around Amol and launched an insurgency against the Islamist Government. The uprising was eventually a failure, and many UIC (S) leaders were shot. The party dissolved in 1982.

Following the dissolution of the Union of Iranian Communists, the Communist Party of Iran (Marxist–Leninist–Maoist) was formed in 2001. The party is a continuation of the Sarbedaran Movement and the Union of Iranian Communists (Sarbedaran). CPI (MLM) believes Iran is a 'semifeudal-semicolonial' country and is trying to launch a 'People's war' in Iran.

Palestine 
The Democratic Front for the Liberation of Palestine is a Maoist political and military organisation. The DFLP's original political orientation was based on the view that Palestinian national goals could be achieved only through a revolution of the masses and people's war.

Philippines 

The Communist Party of the Philippines is the largest communist party in the Philippines, active since December 26, 1968 (Mao's birthday). It was formed due to the First Great Rectification Movement and a split between the old Partido Komunista ng Pilipinas-1930, which the founders saw as revisionist. The CPP was formed on Maoist lines in stark contrast with the old PKP, which focued primarily on the parliamentary struggle. The CPP was founded by Jose Maria Sison and other cadres from the old party.

The CPP also has an armed wing that it exercises absolute control over, namely the New People's Army. It currently wages a guerrilla war against the government of the Republic of the Philippines in the countryside and is still currently active. The CPP and the NPA are part of the National Democratic Front of the Philippines, a consolidation of Maoist sectoral organisations such as Kabataang Makabayan as part of the united front strategy. The NDFP also represents the people's democratic government in peace talks.

Peru 
In the late 1970s, the Peruvian Communist Party, Shining Path developed and synthesised Maoism into Marxism–Leninism–Maoism, a contemporary variety of Marxism–Leninism that is a supposed higher level of Marxism–Leninism that can be applied universally.

Portugal 

Maoist movements in Portugal were very active during the 1970s, especially during the Carnation Revolution that led to the fall of the nationalist government (the Estado Novo) in 1974.

Portugal's most significant Maoist movement was the Portuguese Workers' Communist Party. The party was among the most active resistance movements before the Portuguese democratic revolution of 1974, especially among students of Lisbon. After the revolution, the MRPP achieved fame for its large and highly artistic mural paintings.

Intensely active between 1974 and 1975, during that time, the party had members that later came to be significant in national politics. For example, a future Prime Minister of Portugal, José Manuel Durão Barroso, was active in Maoist movements in Portugal and identified as a Maoist. In the 1980s, the Forças Populares 25 de Abril was another far-left Maoist armed organisation operating in Portugal between 1980 and 1987, aiming to create socialism in post-revolutionary Portugal.

Spain 
The Communist Party of Spain (Reconstituted) was a Spanish clandestine Maoist party. The party's armed wing was the First of October Anti-Fascist Resistance Groups.

Sweden 
In 1968, a small extremist Maoist sect called Rebels was established in Stockholm. Led by Francisco Sarrión, the group unsuccessfully demanded that the Chinese embassy admit them into the Chinese Communist Party. The organisation only lasted a few months.

Turkey 

The Communist Party of Turkey/Marxist–Leninist (TKP/ML) is a Maoist organisation in Turkey currently waging a people's war against the Turkish government. It was founded in 1972 as a split from another illegal Maoist party, the Revolutionary Workers' and Peasants' Party of Turkey (TİİKP), which Doğu Perinçek founded in 1969, led by İbrahim Kaypakkaya. The party's armed wing is named the Workers' and Peasants' Liberation Army in Turkey (TİKKO).

TİİKP is succeeded by the Patriotic Party, a Kemalist, left-wing nationalist, and Eurasianist party.

United Kingdom

United States 

After the tumultuous 1960s (particularly the events of 1968, such as the launch of the Tet Offensive, the assassination of Martin Luther King Jr., nationwide university protests, and the election of Richard Nixon), proponents of Maoist ideology constituted the "largest and most dynamic" branch of American socialism. From this branch came a collection of "newspapers, journals, books, and pamphlets," each of which spoke on the unreformability of the American system and proclaimed the need for a concerted social revolution. Among the many Maoist principles, the group of aspiring American revolutionaries sympathized with the idea of a protracted people's war, which would allow citizens to address the oppressive nature of global capitalism martially.

Mounting discontent with racial oppression and socioeconomic exploitation birthed the two largest, officially-organized Maoist groups: the Revolutionary Communist Party and the October League. However, these were not the only groups: a slew of organizations and movements emerged across the globe as well, including I Wor Kuen, the Black Workers Congress, the Puerto Rican Revolutionary Workers Organization, the August Twenty-Ninth Movement, the Workers Viewpoint Organization, and many others—all of which overtly supported Maoist doctrine.

Orchestrated by The Guardian, in the spring of 1973, an attempt to conflate the strands of American Maoism was made with a series of sponsored forums titled "What Road to Building a New Communist Party?" The forums drew 1,200 attendees to a New York City auditorium that spring. The central message of the event revolved around "building an anti-revisionist, non-Trotskyist, non-anarchist party". From this, other forums were held worldwide, covering topics such as "The Role of the Anti-Imperialist Forces in the Antiwar Movement" and "The Question of the Black Nation"—each forum rallying, on average, an audience of 500 activists, and serving as a "barometer of the movement's strength."

The Americans' burgeoning Maoist and Marxist–Leninist movements proved optimistic for a potential revolution, but "a lack of political development and rampant rightist and ultra-leftist opportunism" thwarted the advancement of the greater communist initiative. In 1972, Richard Nixon made a landmark visit to the People's Republic of China to shake hands with Chairman Mao Zedong; this simple handshake marked the gradual pacification of Eastern–Western hostility and the re-formation of relations between "the most powerful and most populous" global powers: the United States and China. Nearly a decade after the Sino-Soviet split, this newfound amiability between the two nations quieted American-based counter-capitalist rumblings and marked the steady decline of American Maoism until its unofficial cessation in the early-1980s.

The Black Panthers Party (BPP) was another American-based, left-wing revolutionary party to oppose American global imperialism; it was a self-described Black militant organization with metropolitan chapters in Oakland, New York, Chicago, Seattle, and Los Angeles, and an overt sympathizer with global anti-imperialistic movements (e.g., Vietnam's resistance of American neo-colonial efforts). In 1971, a year before Nixon's monumental visit, BPP leader Huey P. Newton landed in China, whereafter he was enthralled with the mystical East and the achievements of the Chinese Communist Revolution. After his return to the United States, Newton said that "[e]verything I saw in China demonstrated that the People's Republic is a free and liberated territory with a socialist government" and "[t]o see a classless society in operation is unforgettable". He extolled the Chinese police force as one that "[served] the people" and considered the Chinese antithetical to American law enforcement, which, according to Newton, represented "one huge armed group that was opposed to the will of the people". In general, Newton's first encounter with anti-capitalist society commenced a psychological liberation and embedded within him the desire to subvert the American system in favor of what the BPP called "revolutionary intercommunalism". Furthermore, the BPP was founded on a similar politico-philosophical framework as that of Mao's CCP, that is, "the philosophical system of dialectical materialism" coupled with traditional Marxist theory. The words of Mao, quoted liberally in BPP speeches and writings, served as a guiding light for the party's analysis and theoretical application of Marxist ideology.

In his autobiography Revolutionary Suicide, published in 1973, Newton wrote:
Chairman Mao says that death comes to all of us, but it varies in its significance: to die for the reactionary is lighter than a feather; to die for the revolution is heavier than Mount Tai. [...] When I presented my solutions to the problems of Black people, or when I expressed my philosophy, people said, "Well, isn't that socialism?" Some of them were using the socialist label to put me down, but I figured that if this was socialism, then socialism must be a correct view. So I read more of the works of the socialists and began to see a strong similarity between my beliefs and theirs. My conversion was complete when I read the four volumes of Mao Tse-tung to learn more about the Chinese Revolution.

Criticism and implementation 

Maoism has fallen out of favor within the Chinese Communist Party, beginning with Deng Xiaoping's reforms in 1978. Deng believed that Maoism showed the dangers of "ultra-leftism", manifested in the harm perpetrated by the various mass movements that characterized the Maoist era. In Chinese communism, the term "left" can be considered a euphemism for Maoist policies. However, Deng stated that the revolutionary side of Maoism should be considered separate from the governance side, leading to his famous epithet that Mao was "70% right, 30% wrong". Chinese scholars generally agree that Deng's interpretation of Maoism preserves the legitimacy of Communist rule in China but simultaneously criticizes Mao's brand of economic and political governance.

Critic Graham Young says that Maoists see Joseph Stalin as the last true socialist leader of the Soviet Union but allows the Maoist assessments of Stalin to vary between the extremely positive and the more ambivalent. Some political philosophers, such as Martin Cohen, have seen in Maoism an attempt to combine Confucianism and socialism—what one such called "a third way between communism and capitalism".

Enver Hoxha critiqued Maoism from a Marxist–Leninist perspective, arguing that New Democracy halts class struggle and allows unrestricted capitalist exploitation, that the theory of the three worlds is "counter-revolutionary", and questioned Mao's guerilla warfare methods.

Some say Mao departed from Leninism not only in his near-total lack of interest in the urban working class but also in his concept of the nature and role of the party. For Lenin, the party was sacrosanct because it was the incarnation of the "proletarian consciousness", and there was no question about who were the teachers and who were the pupils. On the other hand, for Mao, this question would always be virtually impossible to answer.

The implementation of Maoist thought in China was responsible for as many as 70 million deaths during peacetime, with the Cultural Revolution, the Anti-Rightist Campaign of 1957–1958, and the Great Leap Forward. Some historians have argued that because of Mao's land reforms during the Great Leap Forward which resulted in famines, thirty million perished between 1958 and 1961. By the end of 1961, the birth rate was nearly cut in half because of malnutrition. Active campaigns, including party purges and "reeducation", resulted in imprisonment or the execution of those deemed contrary to the implementation of Maoist ideals. The incidents of destruction of cultural heritage, religion, and art remain controversial. Some Western scholars saw Maoism as specifically engaged in a battle to dominate and subdue nature and was a catastrophe for the environment.

Populism 
Mao also believed strongly in the concept of a unified people. These notions prompted him to investigate the peasant uprisings in Hunan while the rest of China's communists were in the cities and focused on the orthodox Marxist proletariat. Many of the pillars of Maoism, such as the distrust of intellectuals and the abhorrence of occupational speciality, are typical populist ideas. The concept of "people's war", central to Maoist thought, is directly populist in its origins. Mao believed that intellectuals and party cadres would first become students of the masses and teachers of the masses later. This concept was vital to the aforementioned "people's war" strategy.

Nationalism 
Mao's nationalist impulses also played a crucially important role in adapting Marxism to the Chinese model and in the formation of Maoism. Mao believed that China was to play a crucial preliminary role in the socialist revolution internationally. This belief, or the fervor with which Mao held it, separated Mao from the other Chinese communists and led Mao onto the path of what Leon Trotsky called "Messianic Revolutionary Nationalism", which was central to his philosophy. German post–World War II far-right activist Michael Kühnen, a former Maoist, once praised Maoism as a Chinese form of Nazism.

Mao-Spontex 
Mao-Spontex refers to a Maoist interpretation in western Europe that stresses the importance of the cultural revolution and overthrowing hierarchy.

See also 

 Asiatic mode of production
 Chiangism
 Deng Xiaoping Theory
 History of the People's Republic of China
 Ideology of the Chinese Communist Party
 Mao Zedong's cult of personality
 Marxism–Leninism
 Marxism–Leninism–Maoism
 New Left in China
 Three Principles of the People
 Three Represents
 Scientific Outlook on Development
 Socialism with Chinese characteristics
 Xi Jinping Thought

References

Further reading 

 Brown, Jeremy, and Matthew D. Johnson, eds. Maoism at the Grassroots: Everyday Life in China's Era of High Socialism (Harvard UP, 2015) online review. 
 Cook, Alexander C., ed. Mao's Little Red Book: A Global History (Cambridge UP, 2014).
 Feigon, Lee. Mao: A Reinterpretation. Ivan R. Dee, Publisher.
 Fields,  Belden.  “French Maoism,” in The 60s Without Apology, ed. Sohnya Sayrers et al. (University of Minnesota Press, 1984), 148–78
 Gregor, A. James and Maria Hsia Chang. "Maoism and Marxism in Comparative Perspective." The Review of Politics. Vol. 40, No. 3, (1978). pp. 307–327. . 
 Kang, Liu. "Maoism: Revolutionary globalism for the Third World revisited." Comparative Literature Studies 52.1 (2015): 12–28. online
 Lanza, Fabio. The end of concern: Maoist China, activism, and Asian studies (Duke UP, 2017). online review
 Lovell, Julia. Maoism: A Global History (2019), a comprehensive scholarly history; excerpt
 
 Meisner, Maurice. "Leninism and Maoism: Some Populist Perspectives on Marxism–Leninism in China." The China Quarterly.  No. 45, January–March 1971. pp. 2–36. .
 Mignon, Carlos, and Adam Fishwick. "Origins and evolution of Maoism in Argentina, 1968–1971." Labor History 59.4 (2018): 454–471. online
 Ning, Wang. "Introduction: global Maoism and cultural revolutions in the global context." Comparative literature studies 52.1 (2015): 1–11. online
 Palmer, David Scott. ed. The Shining Path of Peru (2nd ed 1994) excerpt
 Seth, Sanjay. “India Maoism: The Significance of Naxalbari,” in Critical Perspectives on Media and Society, ed. R. Avery and D. Easton (Guilford Press, 1991), 289–313.
 Starn, Orin. "Maoism in the Andes: The Communist Party of Peru-Shining Path and the refusal of history." Journal of Latin American Studies 27.2 (1995): 399–421. online
 Srivastava, Arun. Maoism in India (2015)  excerpt
 Steiner, H. Arthur. "Maoism or Stalinism for Asia?" Far Eastern Survey. Institute of Pacific Relations. Vol. 22, No. 1, January 14, 1953. p. 1–5. .
 Marxism in the Chinese Revolution by Arif Dirlik.
 Trotskyism and Maoism: Theory and Practise in France and the United States. A. Belden Fields (1988).
 Rethinking Mao: Explorations in Mao Zedong's Thought by Nick Knight.
 The Function of "China" in Marx, Lenin, and Mao by Donald Lowe.
 Maoism and the Chinese Revolution: A Critical Introduction by Elliott Liu. 
 Li Ta-chao and the Origins of Chinese Marxism by Maurice Meisner.
 Marxism, Maoism, and Utopianism: Eight Essays by Maurice Meisner. 
 Mao's China and After by Maurice Mesiner.
 Continuity and Rupture: Philosophy in the Maoist Terrain by J. Moufawad-Paul (2017).
 The Political Thought of Mao Tse-Tung by Stuart Schram.
 Mao Tse-Tung, the Marxist Lord of Misrule: On Practice and Contradiction by Slavoj Zizek.
 Mao Tse-Tung Unrehearsed by Stuart Schram (Pelican).

External links 

 "Guiding thought of revolution: the heart of Maoism" (PDF). international project.
 Marx2Mao.org. Mao Internet Library.
 The Encyclopedia of Marxism. Mao Zedong Thought.
 The Encyclopedia of Marxism. Mao's life.
 Monthly Review  (January 2005). Text of the leaflets distributed by the Zhengzhou Four.
 World Revolution Media. Maoist revolutionary film, music and art archive.
 Batchelor, J. (2009). "Maoism and Classical Marxism" . Clio History Journal.
 "A new economic study says China could grow more quickly by 2036 if Chairman Mao's policies were brought back". Business Insider. 10 August 2015.

 
Maoist terminology
1950s in China
1960s in China
1970s in China
1950s establishments in China
1970s disestablishments in China
Anti-fascism
Anti-capitalism
Anti-revisionism
Authoritarianism
Chinese philosophy
Contemporary Chinese philosophy
Eponymous political ideologies
Far-left politics
Ideology of the Chinese Communist Party
Mao Zedong
Marxism–Leninism
Marxist schools of thought
People's Republic of China culture
Political history of China
Totalitarianism
Types of socialism